Quinupristin/dalfopristin, or quinupristin-dalfopristin, (pronunciation: kwi NYOO pris tin / dal FOE pris tin) (trade name Synercid) is a combination of two antibiotics used to treat infections by staphylococci and by vancomycin-resistant Enterococcus faecium.

Quinupristin and dalfopristin are both streptogramin antibiotics, derived from pristinamycin. Quinupristin is derived from pristinamycin IA; dalfopristin from pristinamycin IIA. They are combined in a weight-to-weight ratio of 30% quinupristin to 70% dalfopristin.

Administration
Intravenous, usually 7.5 mg/kg every 8 hours (infections/life threatening VRSA); every 12 hours (skin infections).
No renal dosing adjustments, hepatic dosing adjustments are not defined, consider reducing dose.

Mechanism of action

Quinupristin and dalfopristin are protein synthesis inhibitors in a synergistic manner. While each of the two is only a bacteriostatic agent, the combination shows bactericidal activity.

Dalfopristin binds to the 23S portion of the 50S ribosomal subunit, and changes the conformation of it, enhancing the binding of quinupristin by a factor of about 100. In addition, it inhibits peptidyl transfer.
Quinupristin binds to a nearby site on the 50S ribosomal subunit and prevents elongation of the polypeptide, as well as causing incomplete chains to be released.

Pharmacokinetics
Clearance by the liver CYP450:3A4 inhibitor, half-life quinupristin 0.8 hours, dalfopristin 0.7 hours (with persistence of effects for 9–10 hours).

Excretion: Quinupristin:  85% feces, 15% urine; Dalfopristin: 81% feces, 19% urine

Side effects
 
Serious:
C.diff-associated diarrhea
superinfection
anaphylactoid reactions
angioedema

Common:
Joint aches (arthralgia) or muscle aches (myalgia)
Nausea, diarrhea (C. diff associated) or vomiting
Rash or itching
Headache
Hyperbilirubinemia
Anemia
Thrombophlebitis

Drug interactions
The drug inhibits P450 and enhances the effects of terfenadine, astemizole, indinavir, midazolam, calcium channel blockers, warfarin, cisapride and ciclosporin.

References

Further reading 

 
 
 .
 
 

Combination antibiotics